The Catholic church of St Sigismund in Grinava (Slovak: Katolícky kostol svätého Žigmunda v Grinave) is a 14th-century listed building as well as a Roman Catholic parish church in Grinava, Pezinok, Slovakia.

Architecture
The sanctuary and nave were built by German colonists in the early 14th century in a Gothic style, to replace a Romanesque church that had stood on the site. The location was fortified with a stone wall, part of which still stands. A side aisle was added at the end of 14th century.

There are three altars. The current main altar, dedicated to St Sigismund of Burgundy, was built by Jozef Seilnacht in a neo-Gothic style in 1910.

History
During the Reformation and Counter-Reformation the church changed hands several times, being Protestant from 1611 to 1617 and again from 1645 to 1673. The present church tower was erected while the building was in use as a Lutheran church.

Towards the end of the Second World War the tower, in use by German snipers, was damaged by Russian shells.

References

External links
 http://www.apsida.sk/c/2375/pezinok-myslenice

Gothic architecture in Slovakia
14th-century Roman Catholic church buildings in Slovakia
Monuments and memorials in Slovakia